Gérard Kobéané (born 24 April 1988 in Karangasso-Vigué Department) is a Burkinabé sprinter. At the 2012 Summer Olympics, he competed in the 100 metres preliminaries advancing to the first round where he was eliminated.

Competition record

1Disqualified in the final

Personal bests
Outdoor
100 metres – 10.29 (+2.0 m/s, Maputo 2011)
200 metres – 21.38 (-0.6 m/s, Porto Novo 2012)
Indoor
60 metres – 6.76 (Birmingham 2016)

References

1988 births
Living people
Burkinabé male sprinters
Olympic athletes of Burkina Faso
Athletes (track and field) at the 2012 Summer Olympics
Athletes (track and field) at the 2015 African Games
People from Hauts-Bassins Region
World Athletics Championships athletes for Burkina Faso
Competitors at the 2009 Summer Universiade
Competitors at the 2011 Summer Universiade
African Games competitors for Burkina Faso
21st-century Burkinabé people